Halvor is a name of Norwegian origin. It is a contemporary form of Halvard (Hallvard). From Old Norse hallr (“flat stone”) and vorðr (“guardian”).

People

First name 
 Halvor Birch (born 1885), Danish gymnast 
 Halvor Birkeland (born 1894), Norwegian sailor
 Halvor Bjellaanes (born 1925), Norwegian politician
 Halvor Bunkholt (born 1903), Norwegian politician
 Halvor Bachke Guldahl (born 1859), Norwegian jurist and businessman
 Halvor Olaus Christensen (born 1800), Norwegian politician
 Halvor Cleophas {1842-1937), American farmer and politician
 Halvor Olsen Folkestad (born 1807), Norwegian bishop and councillor 
 Halvor Hagen (born 1947), American football player
 Halvor Stein Grieg Halvorsen (born 1909), Norwegian actor
 Halvor Thorbjørn Hjertvik (born 1914), Norwegian politician 
 Halvor Kleppen (born 1947), Norwegian media personality
 Halvor Kongsjorden (born 1911), Norwegian sports shooter
 Halvor Midtbø (born 1883), Norwegian priest
 Halvor Møgster (born 1875), Norwegian sailor
 Halvor Moxnes (born 1944), Norwegian politician 
 Halvor Næs (born 1927), Norwegian ski jumper
 Halvor Nordhaug (born 1953), Norwegian bishop
 Halvor H. Peterson (1831-1917), American politician and farmer
 Halvor Heyerdahl Rasch (born 1805), Norwegian zoologist
 Halvor Saamundsen (born 1877), Norwegian politician
 Halvor Schou (born 1823), Norwegian industrialist
 Halvor Skramstad Lunn (born 1980), Norwegian snowboarder
 Halvor Sørum (born 1897), Norwegian unionist
 Halvor Steenerson (born 1852), Representative from Minnesota
 Halvor Stenstadvold (born 1944), Norwegian businessperson and politician

Middle name
 Tor Halvor Bjørnstad (born 1978, Norwegian cross-country skier 
 Jan Halvor Halvorsen (born 1963), Norwegian football player
 Lars Halvor Jensen (born 1973), Norwegian record producer
 Marius Halvor Skram-Jensen (born 1881), Norwegian Danish Gymnast

Surname
Halvorson

Variant spellings

See also
 Halvorsen

References

Norwegian masculine given names